Latur is a city in the Indian state of Maharashtra, and is one of the largest cities of the Marathwada region. It is the administrative headquarters of Latur district and Latur Taluka. The city is a tourist hub surrounded by many historical monuments, including Udgir Fort and Kharosa Caves. The people in Latur are called Laturkar. The most spoken language in Latur is Marathi. The city's quality of education attracts students from all over Maharashtra. It is a drought prone area with acute water shortage in its city and rural areas. The economy is agriculture intensive and amounts in highest farmer suicide rates in India. Industrial development is minimal in the district. Latur is 43 kilometers from the epicenter of the devastating 1993 Latur earthquake.

History
Latur has an ancient history, which probably dates to the Rashtrakuta period. It was home to a branch of Rashtrakutas which ruled the Deccan from 753 to 973 AD. The first Rashtrakuta king, Dantidurga, was from Lattaluru, the ancient name for Latur. Ratnapur is also mentioned as an historic name for Latur.

The King Amoghavarsha of Rashtrakutas developed the Latur city. The Rashtrakutas who succeeded the Chalukyas of Badami in 753 AD called themselves the residents of Lattaluru.

It was, over the centuries, variously ruled by the Satavahanas, the Sakas, the Chalukyas, the Yadavas of Deogiri, the Delhi Sultans, the Bahamani rulers of South India, Adilshahi, and the Mughals.

In Latur's Papvinashak Temple a 12th-century inscription of King Someshvara III was found. According to that inscription, 500 scholars were living in Lattlaur (Latur) at that time and that Latur was the city of King Someshwar.

In the 19th century, Latur became part of the Princely state of Hyderabad. In 1905 it was merged with surrounding areas and renamed Latur tehsil, becoming part of Osmanabad district. Before 1948, Latur was a part of Hyderabad State under Nizam. The chief of the Razakar's, Qasim Rizwi, was from Latur.

After Indian independence and the Indian annexation of Hyderabad, Osmanabad became part of Bombay Province. In 1960, with the creation of Maharashtra, Latur became part of one of its districts. On August 16, 1982, a separate Latur district was carved out of Osmanabad district.

Geography and climate

Latur is situated 636 metres above mean sea level, on the Balaghat plateau, near the Maharashtra–Karnataka state boundary. It receives its drinking water from the nearby Manjira River, which suffered from environmental degradation and silting in the late 20th and early 21st centuries. As a result of this and lack of implementation of a water management strategy, during the drought of the 2010s the city ran out of water.

Rainfall: Most of the rainfall occurs in the monsoon season from June to September.

Recently, Latur has been bearing the brunt of climate change. Extreme weather episodes, including torrential rainfall and even hailstorms in summers, have been showing up in Latur for over a decade now.

Latur earthquake of 1993

Consequently, the resultant shock waves, being unattenuated, caused more damage. The quake caused around 10,000 deaths  and 30,000 were injured, mainly due to the poor construction of stone houses and huts which collapsed on people who were fast asleep. After the earthquake, seismic zones were reclassified, and building codes and standards revised, all over India.

Demographics
Latur's population, as of the 2011 census, is 396,955.

Most residents of the city speak Marathi (62% per district census, urban areas), with Urdu (18%) and Hindi (9%) also being widely spoken.

Administration and politics

Local administration

 
Latur has an earlier Municipal Council, which was established in 1952. Latur Municipal Corporation (LMC) is the local civil body. It is divided into five zones. It was elevated to the status of Municipal Corporation by the State Government in 2011.

The Urban Development Dept., Govt. of Maharashtra expressed its desire vide letter dated 30/10/2006 to notify fringe area of Latur and appoint CIDCO as its Special Planning Authority. CIDCO has submitted its proposal to notify the fringe area measuring approx. 26541.00 ha. inclusive of urbanisable zone of about 16696 ha. Govt. has appointed CIDCO as Special Planning Authority. The notified area covers 40 villages on the fringe of Latur Municipal Corporation. It is envisaged in the project not to acquire 100% land but to adopt minimum land acquisition model for development of infrastructure and growth corridors.

The city is divided in 70 electoral wards called as Prabhag and each ward is represented by a Corporator (called as Nagarsevak) elected by the people from each ward. LMC is responsible for providing basic amenities such as drinking water, drainage facility, road, street lights, healthcare facilities and primary schools. LMC collects its revenue from the urban taxes which are imposed on citizens. The administration is headed by the Commissioner of Municipal Corporation; an I.A.S. Officer, assisted by the other officers of different departments.

State and central administration

Latur contributes one seat to the Lok Sabha. The seat is currently held by Sudhakar Shringare, MP, of the BJP. It also holds one seat for the Assembly - Latur Indian National Congress. In latest constituency arrangements made by Election Commission of India, Latur will contribute one Loksabha seat, and two state assembly seats, i.e. Latur City and Latur Rural.

Prominent politicians from Latur

Latur is called the "city of politicians".

Keshavrao Sonawane was the first minister from Latur region who was in the cabinet of Maharashtra Chief Minister Yashwantrao Chavan and later in the cabinet of Vasantrao Naik, as cooperatives minister, 1962–1967.

The city is the birthplace of other politicians, such as Shivraj Patil and Diliprao Deshmukh.

Vilasrao Deshmukh was born in Babhalgaon village, Latur. He served twice as Chief Minister of Maharashtra state, and twice as Union cabinet minister.

Amidst national political controversy is the death, on 1 December 2014, of judge Brijgopal Harkishan Loya of the Central Bureau of Investigation, who was addressing the case involving Amit Shah, the national leader of the Bharatiya Janata Party (BJP) and who was cremated at his native village of Gategaon.

Vikrant Vikram Gojamgunde is the mayor of Latur. He became mayor in 2019. He is the youngest mayor in the state of Maharashtra.

Education and research

Latur has developed into an educational hub for secondary, higher secondary, and university education. The district is known in Maharashtra for its "Latur Pattern" of study, which involves intensive coaching given in the city. Students of junior colleges in Latur have a good record in taking competitive engineering and medical entrance exams.

Basic and higher education
Public schools (known locally as municipality schools) are run by the LMC, and are affiliated with the MSBSHSE. Private schools are run by educational trusts or individuals. They are usually affiliated with either the state board or national education boards, such as the ICSE or CBSE boards.

University education
Due to more than 140 colleges, the city is known as an educational hub in Marathwada. Many of the students studying in the colleges and the University are from nearby districts. Most colleges in Latur are affiliated with the Nanded University. There is a sub-center of SRTMUN at Latur.

The M. S. Bidve Engineering College, Latur, founded in 1983, is one of the oldest engineering colleges in Marathwada. The Maharashtra Institute of Medical Science & Research Latur was founded in 1988 by Vishwanath Karad.

The Border Security Force Training Centre, Chakur and the Disaster Management Training Institute were established in Latur in 2005 and 2008, respectively.

Dayanand Law College was established by the Dayanand Education Society. Established medical schools such as the Government Medical College, Manjara Ayurvedic College are present in the city.

Channabasweshwar Pharmacy College is a degree college that provides diploma, degree, and master courses in the pharmacy field. Other pharmacy colleges are Dayanand College of Pharmacy and Vilasrao Deshmukh College of Pharmacy.

Vilasrao Deshmukh Foundation's (VDF) College is a degree college that provides diploma, degree, courses in the engineering and pharmacy field. Other pharmacy colleges are Dayanand College of Pharmacy and Vilasrao Deshmukh College of Pharmacy.

Rajarshi Shahu College, Latur, is a reputed college for undergraduate as well as post graduate education. It provides education in Arts, Humanities, Social Sciences, Natural Sciences, Mathematics and Commerce.

Professional education
Latur is home to a branch of the Western India Regional Council of the Institute of Chartered Accountants of India, along with an exam centre, Information Technology training lab, reading room, and a library for Chartered Accountants as well as for students.

Medical education is provided by the Vilasrao Deshmukh Government Medical College and Institute, a public institute of medicine under the Maharashtra University of Health Sciences. Maharashtra Academy for Education and Research (MAERS Pune) runs a private medical college known as Maharashtra Institute of Medical Sciences and Research MIMSR and Yeshwantrao Chavan Rural Hospital, Latur.

Engineering and technology education is provided by M.S. Bidve College of Engineering, Puranmal Lahoti Government Polytechnic, and Government Residential Women's Polytechnic Latur.

Trade and industries
The city is a major sugarcane and edible oils, soybean, grapes and mango production centre. A fine blend of mango with locally grown mangoes was developed as Keshar Amba. Oil seeds was the major produce of Latur region. So for benefit of farmers Keshavrao Sonavane had established Dalda Factory which was Asia's first oil mill set up on cooperative terms.

Till 1990, Latur languished as a city, remaining an industrially backward. In 1960, region of Marathwada was merged with Maharashtra. This was the time when the industrial development of the Marathwada region began, propelled through designated backward area benefits. Latur got its first MIDC setup during the tenure of then Co-operative minister Keshavrao Sonavane. It was only when the MIDC (Maharashtra Industrial Development Corporation) began acquiring land and setting up industrial estates that it began to grow. Many companies have manufacturing plants in Latur, in agriculture processing, edible oils, biotech, consumer durables, plastic processing, and aluminium processing; but the majority are small- and medium-scale agricultural industries, not industrial ones.

Latur has the largest trading centre for soybean in India. The green city is inside what is called 'Sugar Belt' of Maharashtra. The district has more than eleven sugar factories, which makes it among the highest sugar-producing districts of India. It also has oil seeds, commodities and fruit market.

Latur is also known for high quality grapes and houses many state and privately owned cold storage facilities. A grape wine park spread over 1.42 square kilometres (350 acres) has been established near Ausa, 18 km from Latur city. A brand new Latur Food Park, spread across 1.2 square kilometres (300 acres) is under construction at Additional MIDC Latur. Latur is major transport junction to south India.

Latur sugar belt
The Latur region is known as the "Sugar Belt of India". This region houses over eleven large sugar factories. Most of the sugar factories of the Latur sugar belt work on the co-operative basis. Latur got its title "Sugar Belt of India" largely due to the efforts of its cooperative political leader Keshavrao Sonawane, who was instrumental in setting up several co-operative institutions in Latur, Osmanabad, and elsewhere in Maharashtra.

MIDC industrial areas in Latur
 Latur Industrial Area
 Additional Latur Phase I Industrial Area
 Additional Latur Phase II Industrial Area
 Latur Co-Operative Industrial Estate
 Murud taluka Co-Operative Industrial Estate
 Chakur Co-Operative Industrial Estate
 Udaygiri Co-Operative Industrial Estate
 Ausa Industrial Area
 Ahmedpur Industrial Area
 Nilanga Industrial Area
 Udgir Industrial Area

Specialised industrial parks and export zones in Latur
 Latur Food Park
 Latur Infotech Park
 Latur Integrated Textile Park, Latur
 Bombay Rayon Fashions, Latur
 Grape Yards, Ausa

Chamber of Commerce and industry associations
 Latur Chamber of Commerce, Latur
 Latur Manufacturers Association, MIDC
 Engineers and Architects Association, Latur
 Latur Builders Association, Latur
 Computers and Media Dealers Association (CMDA), Latur
 Latur Branch of the Western India Regional Council of the Institute of Chartered Accountants of India

Transport

Road
Latur is connected by roads with various major cities of Maharashtra and other states. Road connectivity is excellent, and roads connecting to Mumbai, Pune, Nagpur, Nanded, Satara, Kolhapur, Sangli, and Aurangabad are being upgraded to four-lane highways. Latur city has one national highway running through it, NH 361.

Intercity
The scheme of nationalisation of passenger transport services was started as early as 1932 by the State of Hyderabad, which was one of the pioneers in the field of public road transport, first in collaboration with the railways and then as a separate Government Department. After the reorganisation of the Indian states and with an effective date from 1 July 1961, the Marathwada State Transport was amalgamated with the Bombay State Road Transport Corporation into the Maharashtra State Road Transport Corporation. The "Maharashtra State Road Transport Corporation" (MSRTC) and numerous other private bus operators provide a bus service to all parts of the state.

The "Maharashtra State Road Transport Corporation" (MSRTC) and numerous other private bus operators provide a bus service to all parts of the state. Private buses have an established network to connect the city with all the major cities in Maharashtra and other states.

Intracity transport
"Latur Municipal Transport" (LMT) is an intra-city bus service which covers almost all parts of the city and also connects to the more distant industrial suburbs. LMT (Latur Municipal Transport) intra-city buses ply throughout the city including the outskirts and connect different parts of the city and adjoining suburbs together.

Air
The Airport facilities include aircraft fuelling, night landing with navigational aids, aircraft parking, CAT VII airport fire fighting and rescue service. A well equipped terminal building has VIP lounges, departure and arrival lounges, transit suites and snooze cabins, visitors' waiting area, and a cafeteria.

Rail

This railway service was closed after the gauge conversion of Miraj-Latur section from metre to broad gauge. The old and centrally located Latur Railway Station on metre gauge was abandoned thereafter.

The station (code: LUR) is located on the Latur-Miraj section of the Solapur railway division of the Central Railway zone. The Manmad-Kacheguda broad-gauge railway line, which emanates from the Vikarabad-Latur-Road-Parli trunk route at Latur Road, is an important artery of traffic in Latur district. It also serves as a link between Aurangabad and Hyderabad.

Latur has rail connectivity with Bangalore, Mumbai, Pune, Nagpur, Manmad, Aurangabad, Nanded, Parbhani, Parli Vaijnath, Osmanabad, Mudkhed, Adilabad, Basar, Nizamabad, Nashik and Kacheguda.

The Miraj–Latur railway track is being electrified. Work is expected to be completed around 2024.

Latur has been blessed with the new Marathwada Railway Coach Factory being set up at Latur. Located near the Harangul Railway Station, the factory was set up by the Indian Raillways' undertaking Rail Vikas Nigam Limited RVNL in 2018. First coach shell was produced on 25 December 2020, on Good Governance Day. The factory has been designed with an initial capacity of 250 MEMU/EMU/LHB coaches per annum.

Places of interest

Religious sites 
It was built by King Tamradwaj and dedicated to Lord Siddharameshwar Swamy Siddarama of Solapur, who is a gramdaivat ("town deity") of Latur town.
 Ganj Golai is in the centre of latur city. Latur town planner Faiyajuddin designed the "Ganjgolai Chowk". The main building of the Golai is a huge two-storey structure which was constructed around the year 1917. In the middle of the circular structure is a temple of the Goddess Ambabai. There are 19 roads connecting to this golai ("roundabout") and along these roads are separate markets selling various traditional local wares from gold ornaments to footwear and food items from chili to jaggery.
 Shri Ashtavinayak Mandir is located in Shivaji Nagar, Latur. Constructed in 1989, it is a newly built temple famous for its beauty, as there are gardens on both sides of the temple, as well as some artificial fountains in front. A statue of lord Shiva, standing 8 to 9 feet tall is situated in the garden.
 The Buddha Garden Temple has a large statue of Buddha.
 Shri Virat Hanuman Mandir is situated at the Parivar Housing Society, close to Ausa Street, Latur. The construction of this sanctuary is quite different from different sanctuaries. this sanctuary is additionally surrounded by an excellent garden. This icon is nearly 28 feet high and is coloured scarlet red (shenderi).
 Shri Keshav Balaji Temple is located in the city of Ausa, in Latur district. The temple is encompassed by slopes. There are four different sanctuaries: dedicated to Lord Ganesha, Lord Shiva, Lord Vitthal, and Goddess Rukmini, as well as to Keshavanand Bapu in similar premises. The sanctuary opens at 6:00 am and closes at 9:00 pm. Distinctive Sevas are performed for the duration of the day. There is an ordinary Prasadam, at 10:00 am and 7:00 pm, for guests. Mahaprasadam is held each Friday midway between 10:00 am and 6:00 pm. This temple is part of the Dharma va Sanskar Nagari ("Religion and Sacrament City") project.
 Surat Shahawali Dargah is situated in Patel Chowk Ram Galli, which is part of Latur city. This darga was built around 1939 in memory of a Muslim holy person, Saif Ullah Shaha Sardari, who achieved Samadhi there. A yearly 5-day-long fair is held here in June or July.

Parks 
 Nana Nani Park is also known as Vilasrao Deshmukh Park. It is centrally situated, near the municipal office, and is popular with people due to its relaxing atmosphere. People walk here and spend time with family, children, and friends. There is a space for community meetings at the center of the park. An open theater is also available.

Geographical location
Latur city is situated in Marathwada region in southern part of Maharashtra.  Latur is 498 km from state capital Mumbai and 484 km from winter capital Nagpur(via Nanded, Yawatmal, Wardha).

Notable people
Vilasrao Deshmukh was an Indian politician who served two terms as the Chief Minister of the state of Maharashtra. He also served in the Union cabinet as the Minister of Science and Technology and Minister of Earth Sciences.
Shivraj Vishwanath Patil is an Indian politician who was the Governor of the state of Punjab and Administrator of the Union Territory of Chandigarh from 2010 to 2015. Previously, he was the Speaker of the 10th Lok Sabha from 1991 to 1996 and served in Manmohan Singh's cabinet as Union Minister of Home Affairs from 2004 to 2008. He also served in the Indira Gandhi and Rajiv Gandhi cabinets as Minister of Defence during the 1980s.
Riteish Deshmukh is an Indian film actor, producer, and architect. He is known for his work in Hindi and Marathi cinema. He is the son of the former Chief Minister of Maharashtra late Vilasrao Deshmukh and Vaishali Deshmukh.
Sambhaji Patil Nilangekar is a Member of the 13th Maharashtra Legislative Assembly and represents Nilanga. He is a member of the Bharatiya Janata Party (BJP). Nilangekar was inducted into the cabinet of Devendra Fadnavis in 2016 and has the portfolio of Labour Skill Development & Entrepreneurship.

Keshavrao Sonavane was the minister of co-operation in Yashwantrao Chavan's cabinet and later Vasantrao Naik's cabinet during 1962–1967. He was elected as Member of the Maharashtra Legislative Assembly 4 times, twice from Latur City and twice from Ausa.

See also
 Marathwada
 List of Indian princely states
 List of Maratha dynasties and states
 Maratha Empire

References

External links
Latur police department
Latur Government Site

 
Cities and towns in Latur district
Latur district
Talukas in Maharashtra
Cities in Maharashtra